Lecithocera licnitha is a moth in the family Lecithoceridae. It was described by Chun-Sheng Wu and You-Qiao Liu in 1993. It is found in Yunnan, China.

The wingspan is about 15 mm. The species resembles Lecithocera acolasta, but in this species the costal margin of the forewings is almost straight and the discocellular dot is free.

References

Moths described in 1993
licnitha
Moths of Asia